Jovica Vasilić (Serbian Cyrillic: Јовица Василић; born 8 July 1990) is a Serbian footballer who plays as a right-back.

Career statistics

External links
 Utakmica profile
 Srbijafudbal profile

1990 births
Living people
People from Priboj
Serbian footballers
Association football defenders
FK Sloga Kraljevo players
FK Sloboda Užice players
FK Novi Pazar players
OFK Beograd players
FK Vojvodina players
Serbian First League players
Serbian SuperLiga players